Donald Harvey (April 15, 1952 – March 30, 2017) was an American serial killer who claimed to have murdered 87 people, though official estimates are between 37 and 57 victims. He was able to do this during his time as a hospital orderly. His spree took place between 1970 and 1987.

Harvey claimed to have begun killing to "ease the pain" of patientsmostly cardiac patientsby smothering them with their pillows. However, he gradually grew to enjoy killing and became a self-described "angel of death". At the time of his death, Harvey was serving 28 life sentences at the Toledo Correctional Institution in Toledo, Ohio, having pled guilty to murder charges to avoid execution.

Early life
Donald Harvey was born in Hamilton, Ohio on April 15, 1952, the oldest of three children born to Ray and Goldie Harvey. He was raised in the tiny Appalachian town of Booneville, Kentucky, where his parents were struggling tobacco farmers and members of the local Baptist church. From the ages of five to eighteen, Harvey was sexually molested by both an uncle and a neighbor, but he told no one except his sister, and only after the abuse ended. Harvey dropped out of school in the ninth grade, but he earned a correspondence school GED in 1968. After an arrest for burglary in March 1971, Harvey enlisted in the United States Air Force, but was discharged after nine months due to two suicide attempts; after these nervous breakdowns, he came to terms with his homosexuality.

Murders
Harvey began working in hospitals at the age of 18. His first medical job was as an orderly at the Marymount Hospital in London, Kentucky. He later confessed that during the ten-month period he worked at the hospital, he killed at least a dozen patients. His second victim was killed in the room with Danny George, a twelve-year-old child. Harvey was insistent that he killed purely out of a sense of empathy for the suffering of those who were terminally ill, but also admitted that many of the killings were committed were due to anger at the victims. Unusual for a serial killer, Harvey had no specific target- his victims were men and women of all ages, races, ethnicities and backgrounds. The only thing they had in common was that they were all cardiac patients.

The full extent of Harvey's crimes may never be known since so many were undetected for so long. He did not use any particular modus operandi and used many methods to kill his victims, such as: arsenic, cyanide, insulin, suffocation, miscellaneous poisons, morphine, turning off ventilators, administration of fluid tainted with hepatitis B and/or HIV (which resulted in a hepatitis infection, but no HIV infection, and illness rather than death), and insertion of a coat hanger into a catheter, causing an abdominal puncture and subsequent peritonitis. Cyanide and arsenic were his most-used methods, with Harvey administering them via food or injections. The majority of Harvey's crimes took place at the Marymount Hospital, the Cincinnati V.A. Medical Hospital, and Cincinnati's Drake Memorial Hospital. At various times, he worked as an orderly or an autopsy assistant.

Harvey did not limit his victims to helpless hospital patients. When he suspected his lover and roommate Carl Hoeweler of infidelity, he poisoned Hoeweler's food with arsenic so he would be too ill to leave their apartment. He poisoned two of his neighborssickening one, Diane Alexander, by putting hepatitis serum in her drink, and killing the other, Helen Metzger, by putting arsenic in her pie. He also killed Hoeweler's father Henry with arsenic.

Investigation 
After keeping his crimes hidden for seventeen years, Harvey slipped in March 1987. An autopsy on John Powell, who had died abruptly after spending several months on life support following a motorcycle accident, revealed large amounts of cyanide in his system. Harvey became a person of interest when investigators learned he had been forced to resign from the Cincinnati VA hospital after he was caught stealing body parts for occult rituals. At the time, most hospitals did not vet orderlies as closely as doctors or nurses. When they brought Harvey in for questioning, he confessed to Powell's murder, claiming he had euthanized him with cyanide.

Pat Minarcin, then an anchor at Cincinnati station WCPO-TV, found it unlikely that someone who had spent almost two decades caring for patients could suddenly kill one without having killed before. During his report on the night of Harvey's arrest, Minarcin asked on-air if there had been any other deaths. It was soon revealed that several nurses at Drake had raised concerns with administrators upon noticing a spike in deaths while Harvey was employed there, but they had been ordered to keep quiet. Not wanting to chance that he would be acquitted, the nurses contacted Minarcin and told him that there was evidence Harvey killed at least ten more people. Over the next several months, Minarcin investigated the suspicious deaths and amassed enough evidence to air a half-hour special report detailing evidence that linked Harvey to at least 24 murders in a four-year period. Harvey had been able to stay under the radar in part because he worked in an area of Drake where patients were not expected to survive.

When Harvey's court-appointed lawyer, Bill Whalen, was briefed in advance about Minarcin's findings, he immediately asked Harvey if he had killed anyone else. Harvey replied that by his "estimate," he had killed as many as 70 people. Whalen knew that if prosecutors could link Harvey to more than one murder, he could receive the death penalty. In a bid to save his client's life, he offered prosecutors a plea bargainif the death penalty were taken off the table, Harvey would accept a sentence of life imprisonment and confess to all of his murders. The prosecutors agreed. In a marathon session with prosecutors, Harvey admitted to killing 24 people.

In August 1987, Harvey pled guilty to 24 counts of first-degree murder. In accordance with the plea agreement, he was sentenced to three concurrent terms of life in prison. The plea agreement allowed prosecutors to seek the death penalty if more murders came to light. With this in mind, that November Harvey pled guilty in Laurel County, Kentucky, circuit court to killing nine patients at Marymount in the 1970s. He was sentenced to life plus 20 years, to run concurrently with the Ohio sentence. Ultimately, Harvey pled guilty to 37 murders. However, he confessed to killing as many as 50 people.

Harvey was incarcerated in the Ohio prison system on October 26, 1987.

Death 
On March 28, 2017, authorities reported that Harvey had been found in his cell severely beaten. He died on March 30, 2017. On May 3, 2019, fellow inmate James Elliott was charged with aggravated murder and other charges related to the death of Donald Harvey. In September 2019, he was sentenced to 25 years to life in prison after pleading guilty to killing Harvey. The sentence was originally ordered to run consecutively to his other sentences, but was later changed to run concurrently. Elliott would have become eligible for parole in 2046, when he would have been 71 years old.

Known victims

Media
WCPO-TV's I-Team, created in 1988, investigated Harvey's crimes. They received several awards for their efforts.
Autopsy covered Harvey's crimes in the 1995 episode "The Angel of Death".
Infamous Murders covered Harvey's case alongside two others in its first episode titles "Angels of Death" in 2001.
Dr. G: Medical Examiner covered the case in the episode "Killers Among Us" in 2009.
My Favorite Murder featured Harvey's case in is 110th released episode in 2018.
Harvey was mentioned along with Elizabeth Wettlaufer in the Season 14 episode of Criminal Minds titled "Broken Wing" in 2018.
And That's Why We Drink covers the case in its 159th episode titled "A Sinister Vibe Check and the Governor of Noodletown" in 2020.

See also 
 Serial killers with health-related professions
 List of serial killers in the United States

References

External links 
 Donald Harvey at The Ohio Department of Rehabilitation and Correction
 Angel of Death: The Donald Harvey Story archived from <crimelibrary>
 CBS News: "Serial killer known as the "Angel of Death" found severely beaten in prison", March 29, 2017
 'Angel of Death' serial killer dies after attack in prison

1952 births
2017 deaths
20th-century American criminals
21st-century LGBT people
American male criminals
American people convicted of murder
American prisoners sentenced to life imprisonment
American serial killers
Criminals from Kentucky
Deaths by beating in the United States
Gay men
Health care professionals convicted of murdering patients
LGBT people from Ohio
Male serial killers
Medical serial killers
People convicted of murder by Ohio
People from Butler County, Ohio
People murdered in Ohio
Poisoners
Prisoners sentenced to life imprisonment by Ohio
Prisoners who died in Ohio detention
Serial killers murdered in prison custody